The Edible Schoolyard (ESY) is a  garden and kitchen program at the Martin Luther King Jr. Middle School, a public middle school in Berkeley, California. The Edible Schoolyard was established in 1995 by chef and author Alice Waters and is supported by the Edible Schoolyard Project, a non-profit founded by Waters in 1995 in celebration of the 25th anniversary of her famed Berkeley, California restaurant, Chez Panisse.

At the Edible Schoolyard, students participate in planting, harvesting and preparing fresh food as part of their school day, and as a means to reinforce lessons of math, science, culture, history; and to make the connections between food, health and the environment.

History
The Edible Schoolyard was founded in 1995 in a vacant lot at the Martin Luther King Jr. Middle School. Waters met with Neil Smith, then principal of King Middle School, to discuss the possibility of transforming the space into a garden project that would involve students, teachers, and the community.

Planning for the Edible Schoolyard garden and after-school cooking classes began in 1995, and were offered in the 1995-1996 school year. The cooking programs at King used organic produce from a local farm until 1997, when they started using the crops harvested from the now thriving Edible Schoolyard garden.  During the 1996-1997 school year, the Edible Schoolyard opened the refurbished Kitchen Classroom, which provided space and equipment for in-school cooking classes.

During the 1998-1999 school year, two Americorps positions were added to the garden and kitchen staff at King Middle School. These positions were established to support that kitchen and garden classes that were now taking place for all 6th, 7th, and 8th graders. In 1999, the Berkeley Unified School District adopted a school food policy that emphasized the use of organic foods in school lunches.

In 2004, the Edible Schoolyard Project co-developed the School Lunch Initiative in partnership with Berkeley Unified School District, the Center for Ecoliteracy and Children's Hospital Oakland Research Center. The School Lunch Initiative was an effort to develop a model for school lunch programs to provide healthy, freshly prepared meals within budget, and connected to kitchen garden learning programs on campus. The initiative emphasized the connection between food education, improved school food, and student knowledge relating to food choices. Chef Ann Cooper was hired to direct the food service program for the Berkeley Unified School District and lead the transition to scratch-based cooking. As a result, processed foods were largely eliminated from the school lunch menu, and local produce became central to all school meals.

As of 2019, the Edible Schoolyard promotes a network of more than 9,500 kitchen/garden programs across the country, provides an annual summer academy for food educators and nutrition services personnel, and continues to create curriculum around kitchen/garden learning for grades 6 and up.

Mission and Goals of the Edible Schoolyard
The mission of the Edible Schoolyard is "to create and sustain an organic garden and landscape that is wholly integrated into the school's curriculum, culture, and food program." ESY aims to involve students in the experience of growing, harvesting, preparing, and sharing food as a means of fostering knowledge of food and food systems, improving students' food choices, and connecting students to the land, the environment, and their community. It also aims to engage students and enhance their educational experience through activities in the garden and the kitchen classrooms. In accordance with these goals, all students at King Middle School participate in the kitchen and garden programs. Garden lessons are linked to the science and math curricula and standards, while kitchen lessons are linked to humanities curricula and standards.

Garden
An example of a garden class taught in the Edible Schoolyard is the amaranth lesson, which focuses on the amaranth grain grown in the garden. In this lesson, students harvest and winnow the amaranth grain in addition to discussing the use of amaranth as a staple crop in ancient civilizations. After harvesting and winnowing the grain, students write an acrostic poem using the letters of the word "amaranth." They then use the amaranth plant to make a pink dye, which highlights an additional use for the plant.

Kitchen
An example of a kitchen lesson is the panzanella lesson, where students learn about the Tuscan origins of the dish, and how it was created to use up old bread, and then participate in preparing and then eating panzanella. In a typical kitchen class, students meet with the classroom teachers to discuss the steps involved in preparing the recipe, and then break into working groups, where they follow the recipe under the supervision of their teachers. Kitchen classes include sharing the finished dish around communal tables in the kitchen classroom and culminate with clean-up.

School Lunch connection
The Edible Schoolyard aims to improve student's relationship to food in conjunction with their experiences in the garden and kitchen classrooms. According to Alice Waters, when students are active in the harvesting and preparing of new foods, they are inclined to try them.

A 2010 evaluation of the School Lunch Initiative by the UC Berkeley Center for Weight and Health found that students who attended elementary and middle schools with highly developed School Lunch Initiative components ate more fruits and vegetables and scored higher on food and nutrition knowledge assessments than their peers who attended schools with lesser developed School Lunch Initiative components.

Schools with highly developed components integrated cooking and gardening classes into the school curriculum in addition to overhauling the school food service with primarily natural, local, and from-scratch foods. Schools with lesser developed components had overhauled school food service, but did not incorporate regular cooking and gardening classes into the school curriculum.

Criticism
 criticized the concept of edible schoolyards as detrimental to the educational needs of children. Flanagan's criticism generated wider discussion of the Edible Schoolyard and other school garden programs. Others argue that "career skills grow along with plants" and that the presence of a school garden serves to add to and enrich a school's curriculum. 

W. Steven Barnett, a professor of education, notes that while "little research exists on the efficacy of a garden-based curriculum," Flanagan presents a false choice, noting that the gardens are "integrated into the child's learning experience." The head of Samuel J. Green School in New Orleans, which also has an Edible Schoolyard, noted an improvement in eating a "healthful diet and doing well in school" among students at the school since the Edible Schoolyard was established.

References

Further reading
 .
 .
 .
 .
 .
 .
 .
 .
 .

External links
 The Edible Schoolyard web site
Edible Schoolyard NYC website

Gardens in California
1995 establishments in California
Culture of Berkeley, California
Food and drink in the San Francisco Bay Area